Luis Felipe Baptista (9 August 1941 - 12 June 2000) was an American ornithologist of Portuguese–Chinese descent born in Hong Kong. He was considered an international expert on bioacoustics, animal behavior and avian systematics.

Education 
Luis Felipe Baptista was born in Hong Kong to a Macanese family that had lived on the Portuguese colony of Macau since the 17th century. Batista resided in Hong Kong and Macau until 1961, when he emigrated to San Francisco as a teenager where he took up a job at the California Academy of Sciences as a curatorial assistant. During his years at the Academy of Sciences, he developed an interest in ornithology under the influence of zoologist Robert T. Orr, then chairman and curator of the Department of Ornithology and Mammalogy. He earned bachelor's and master's degrees at the University of San Francisco and was admitted to the University of California at Berkeley in 1968 for a Ph.D. in zoology. His doctoral research on the song behavior of the White-crowned Sparrow (Zonotrichia leucophrys), supervised by Ned K. Johnson, led to a series of studies that established him as a leading expert of bird vocalization, vocal learning and bird dialects through the rest of his academic career.

Research 
After completing his PhD in 1975, Baptista moved to Germany to continue his research as a postdoc in Klaus Immelmann's lab and as a fellow at the Max Planck Institute of Physiology and Behavior (now part of the Max Planck Institute of Animal Behavior), with Hans Löhrl. In 1973 he took up an assistant professor position at Occidental College in Los Angeles, where he also held the role of curator of the Moore Laboratory of Zoology. From 1980 until his death in 2000, Baptista was Curator of Birds and Chairman of the Department of Ornithology and Mammalogy at the California Academy of Sciences. In 1982, he became a fellow of the academy.

Baptista conducted extensive research internationally, publishing over 120 scholarly articles. His field work in California and in the San Francisco Bay Are in particular made his regular appearance with a tape recorder, a parabolic reflector and a microphone a fixture in the local birdwatching and conservation community. Local newspapers and magazines referred to him as “Birdman Extraordinaire,” “The Sparrow Man of Golden Gate Park,” “The Man Who Speaks Sparrow,” and “Maestro of the Bird Symphony.”

Baptista served on the council (1982–1984) and the International Ornithological Committee (1982–2000) of the American Ornithologists Union, where he became a fellow in 1980. He was also a member of the Cooper Ornithological Society (COS), of which he became an honorary member in 1996. He died unexpectedly in Petaluma, California in 2000.

References 

American ornithologists
People associated with the California Academy of Sciences
Scientists from the San Francisco Bay Area
1941 births
2000 deaths
University of San Francisco alumni
UC Berkeley College of Letters and Science alumni
20th-century American zoologists
Emigrants from British Hong Kong to the United States